Siniora Food and Manufacturing plc. Is a multinational food industry company that produces meat products in Palestine, Jordan, and Saudi Arabia.

Siniora (Also spelled Sanyoora, Sinyoora, Sunyoora, and Sanyoura) is well known in the Arab World for its Mortadella.

Name Change
Siniora Jerusalem was a very reputable name in the Arab World until 1996 when the Arab Palestinian Investment Company (AIPC) acquired the Palestinian branch of Siniora Jerusalem and renamed it to its current name.

References

Multinational food companies
Food and drink companies of Jordan